Charline White (September 1, 1920September 7, 1959) was the first African-American woman to be elected to the Michigan Legislature.

Early life 
White was born in Atlanta, Georgia on September 1, 1920. Sometime in 1923 she moved to Detroit, Michigan. White graduated from Cass Technical High School and attended both Wayne State University and Poro College.

Personal life 
Charline White married LeRoy G. White around 1947. The two divorced in 1953.

Career 
White ran both an advertising business and a floral business. In 1950, White was elected to the Michigan House of Representatives from Wayne County 1st District. She was sworn in for the first time on January 3, 1951. White was a member of the Democratic party. She was re-elected to represent Wayne County 1st District until November 2, 1954 when she was elected to represent Wayne County 11th District. She was sworn in for the first time for this position on January 12, 1955. She would win re-election two more time before her death on September 7, 1959. White died in office on September 7, 1959. Her vacancy was filled by David S. Holmes Jr.

References

Further reading
 Sampson, Cambray, "Profiles: Charline White." Michigan History, May/June 2022, p. 15. Lansing, Michigan: Historical Society of Michigan.

1920 births
1959 deaths
African-American women in politics
People from Atlanta
Politicians from Detroit
African-American state legislators in Michigan
Democratic Party members of the Michigan House of Representatives
Wayne State University alumni
20th-century American women politicians
Women state legislators in Michigan
20th-century African-American women
20th-century African-American politicians
20th-century American politicians
Cass Technical High School alumni